Gerdegeh Gol (also known as Gerdeh Gol) is a village in Dasht-e Bil Rural District, in the Central District of Oshnavieh County, West Azerbaijan Province, Iran. At the 2006 census, its population was 318, in 64 families.

References 

Populated places in Oshnavieh County